Greetings From E Street: The Story of Bruce Springsteen and the E Street Band is a book written by Robert Santelli, published in 2006. It chronicles the large career of the E Street Band, as well as details about their solo projects.

Contents

Chapter 1: Directions to E Street
Chapter 2: E Street Rising
Chapter 3: Running on E Street
Chapter 4: High Times on E Street
Chapter 5: E Street on the Map
Chapter 6: E Street: An International Address
Chapter 7: E Street at the Crossroads
Chapter 8: E Street Forever

References

2006 non-fiction books
Books about rock music
Bruce Springsteen